This is a list of settlements in Tyne and Wear by population based on the results of the 2011 census. The next United Kingdom census will take place in 2021. In 2011, there were 22 built-up area subdivisions with 5,000 or more inhabitants in Tyne and Wear, shown in the table below.

Administrative boundaries 

Table taken from the Tyne and Wear - Settlements section:

Population ranking

See also 
 Tyne and Wear
 Tyneside
 Wearside
 List of urban areas in the United Kingdom

References

External links 
 Link to ONS built up area statistics

Metropolitan areas of England
 
Tyne and Wear
Tyne and Wear